The Country Commercial Guides (CCG) are reports, prepared by United States Commercial Service offices around the world, which provide comprehensive commercial information for U.S. companies looking to do business in a specific country.

Contents 
The type of information you will find includes:

 Economic & Political Environment
 Leading Sectors for U.S. Export and Investment
 Trade regulations, customs and standards
 Investment climate
 Business travel

External links 
 
 
  Full pdf versions from US Department of Commerce..

Foreign trade of the United States